Megachile conjunctiformis is a species of bee in the family Megachilidae. It was described by Yasumatsu in 1938.

References

Conjunctiformis
Insects described in 1938